Pekka Parikka (2 May 1939 – 21 March 1997) was a Finnish film director and screenwriter. His 1989 film The Winter War was entered into the 40th Berlin International Film Festival. He is buried in the Hietaniemi Cemetery in Helsinki.

Selected filmography
 Plainlands (1988)
 The Winter War (1989)
 The Way to a Woman's Heart (1996)

References

External links

1939 births
1997 deaths
Writers from Helsinki
Finnish film directors
Finnish screenwriters
Burials at Hietaniemi Cemetery
20th-century screenwriters